State Route 156 (SR 156), also known as Lee Canyon Road, is a state highway in Clark County, Nevada. The road is one of two highways connecting U.S. Route 95 (US 95) to the Humboldt-Toiyabe National Forest and Spring Mountains area northwest of Las Vegas and its entire length is designated a Nevada Scenic Byway.

When first created in the 1930s, the highway followed a slightly different path that formed State Route 52. The SR 52 designation was later realigned and extended west to the California state line via Pahrump, but was discontinuous through the national forest. The route was ultimately split into separate highways in the 1970s.

History

The road now known as State Route 156 has origins dating to at least 1933. At that time, it was an unimproved county road that ran from State Route 5 (now US 95) at Indian Springs to the northern border of what was then called the Nevada National Forest. By 1935, this road had been designated as State Route 52, and apparently extended through the national forest (along what may now be State Route 158) ending at State Route 39 (now SR 157) east of Charleston Peak.

The routing of SR 52 had been changed by 1937. The highway was moved to the current alignment of Lee Canyon Road, beginning on State Route 5 several miles southeast of Indian Springs and ending in Lee Canyon. Around the same time, the highway designation was extended further west. By 1940, the eastern end of the route between US 95 and the Nevada National Forest had been fully paved. However, a gap now existed between the paved portion of the highway within the national forest and the unimproved road southwest of the western forest boundary. A trail through the Spring Mountains would connect the two segments of State Route 52 in later years. While improvements were made to the western portion of the route in the 1950s and 1960s, the trail through Clark Canyon was never improved to a full roadway.

On July 1, 1976, Nevada began the process of renumbering all of the state's numbered highways. The Lee Canyon Road portion of SR 52 was redesignated as State Route 156, while the portion between Pahrump and the California state line was renumbered to State Route 372. The remainder of the route, from Pahrump to the Toiyabe National Forest, was removed from the state highway system. The changes in route numbering were reflected on official state highway maps beginning in 1978.

By 2017, the first  of SR 156 at the Lee Canyon ski area had been removed from the routing.

The Nevada Department of Transportation designated State Route 156 as a Nevada Scenic Byway in July 1998. The "Mount Charleston/Lee Canyon Road" scenic route encompasses the entire  of highway.

Major intersections

See also

References

156
Spring Mountains
156